New Martinsburg is an unincorporated community in Fayette County, in the U.S. state of Ohio.

History
New Martinsburg was originally called Martinsburg until 1831. The community derives its name from Martinsburg, West Virginia, the native home of a share of the first settlers. A post office was established at New Martinsburg in 1831, and remained in operation until 1906.

References

Unincorporated communities in Fayette County, Ohio
Unincorporated communities in Ohio